Thomas Hemenhale (or Thomas Hempnall) was a medieval Bishop of Norwich-elect and then Bishop of Worcester.

Hemenhale was elected to the see of Norwich on 6 April 1336 but was transferred to the see of Worcester on 14 March 1337 before he was consecrated at Norwich.

Hemenhale was consecrated as Bishop of Worcester on 30 March 1337. He died on 21 December 1338.

Citations

References
 

Bishops of Norwich
Bishops of Worcester
14th-century English Roman Catholic bishops
1338 deaths
Year of birth unknown